The Iraqi rocket attacks on Israel were part of an Iraqi missile campaign against Israel during the First Gulf War.

Background
During the 1948 Arab–Israeli War, Six-Day War and Yom Kippur War, the armies of Iraq and Israel saw action against one another as part of the broader Arab–Israeli conflict. Throughout the entire Iran–Iraq War from 1980 to 1988, Israel supported Iran in its war against Iraq through the supply of military equipment including spare parts for fighter jets, missile systems, ammunition and tank engines. At the onset of the conflict, approximately 80% of all weaponry imported by Iran originated from Israel. However, support for Iran by Israel did not solely rest with military aid; on 7 June 1981 Israel became an active belligerent in the Iran-Iraq War after it bombed Iraq's Osirak Nuclear Reactor. Israel's motivations for supporting Iran stemmed from a fear of what would have become if Iraq came out victorious and as an opportunity to create business for the Israeli arms industry.

Attacks
Throughout the entire Gulf War air campaign, Iraqi forces fired approximately 42 Scud missiles into Israel from 17 January to 23 February 1991. The strategic and political goal of the Iraqi campaign was to provoke an Israeli military response and potentially jeopardize the United States-led coalition against Iraq, which had full backing and/or extensive contributions from an overwhelming majority of the states of the Muslim world and would have suffered immense diplomatic and material losses if Muslim-majority states rescinded their support due to the political situation of the ongoing Israeli–Palestinian conflict. Despite inflicting casualties on Israeli civilians and damaging Israeli infrastructure, Iraq failed to provoke Israeli retaliation due to pressure exerted by the United States on the latter to not respond to "Iraqi provocations" and avoid any bilateral escalations.

The Iraqi missiles were predominantly aimed at the Israeli cities of Tel Aviv and Haifa. Despite numerous missiles being fired, a number of factors contributed to the minimisation of casualties in Israel.

Missiles
Throughout the late 80's, Iraq modified their Scud missile arsenal to create an SRBM known as the Al Hussein. The primary reason for the upgrades was to increase the range of such missiles. However, missile range increase came at a cost of accuracy and structural stability and on a number of occasions, Iraqi missiles fired at Israel either broke up mid-air or fell short of their target. In addition, the missile warheads themselves on a number of occasions failed to detonate with a reported dud missile rate of over 10%.

The missiles fired against Israel were conventional warheads and were not of chemical origin. Had chemical warheads been loaded, casualties would have been far greater.

Warning time
From the second attack onwards, the Israeli population were given a few minutes warning of an impending missile attack. Due to shared United States' satellite information on missile launches, citizens were given appropriate time to seek shelter from the impending missile attack.

Blast-resistant dwellings
Modern multi-story apartment buildings erected in Israel at the time of the attacks were constructed using reinforced concrete columns, beams and floors. Such structurally integral housing units helped to prevent buildings from collapsing as a result of a nearby missile impact.

Casualties
Two Israeli civilians died as a direct result of the missile attacks. Between 11 and 74 were killed from incorrect use of gas masks, heart attacks, and incorrect use of the anti-chemical weapons drug atropine. A total of 4,100 buildings were damaged and at least 28 of those buildings destroyed. The area that sustained the most damage was the city of Ramat Gan.

References

External links
 Israeli Ministry of Foreign Affairs - The Gulf War (1991)

Gulf War
1991 in Israel
1991 in Iraq
Arab–Israeli conflict
Iraq–Israel relations
Iraqi war crimes
Ramat Gan
Attacks in 1991
January 1991 events in Asia
February 1991 events in Asia